Tvrtko Kale (now Dreshler Kale, ; born 5 June 1974) is a retired Croatian-Israeli footballer who played as of July 2015 for Maccabi Kiryat Gat. The newspaper Slobodna Dalmacija rated him the best player in the Croatian First League in 2004.

Club career
Born in Samobor, Zagreb, Croatia, Kale started his career at NK Lokomotiva before moving to NK Hrvatski Dragovoljac in 1994 and NK Čakovec in 1995. From 1996 to 1998 he played for NK Inker moving around the Croatian League until signing with Hajduk Split in 2004. He was league champion with Hajduk in the 2004/2005 season. Starting in 2006, he played for Neuchâtel Xamax.

On 22 June 2007, Kale was transferred from Maccabi Tel Aviv to Israeli league champions Beitar Jerusalem for a price of $350,000 and a 2-year deal worth $300,000 per annum.

Kale moved to Hapoel Be'er Sheva for the 2009–2010 season, and scored one goal for the club

Personal life
In an interview with Israeli sport portal Sport 5, Tvrtko revealed that he is a Jew according to Jewish law, since his grandmother on his mother's side was Jewish. In September 2007, Kale received his own Israeli identity card. He is engaged to Ronit Dahan, who is Jewish. In June 2010 Kale decided to change his first name so it would be more Jewish due to his forthcoming wedding. His new name is Dreshler.

Honours

Player

Club

Hajduk Split
Prva HNL:2004–05
Croatian Supercup: 2005

Beitar Jerusalem
Israeli Premier League: 2007–08
Israel State Cup:2008, 2009

Hapoel Haifa
Toto Cup: 2012–13

See also
List of select Jewish football (association; soccer) players

References

External links
Official website

1974 births
Living people
Footballers from Zagreb
Croatian Jews
Croatian emigrants to Israel
Israeli Jews
Association football goalkeepers
Croatian footballers
Jewish footballers
Israeli footballers
NK Lokomotiva Zagreb players
NK Hrvatski Dragovoljac players
NK Čakovec players
NK Inter Zaprešić players
HNK Rijeka players
NK Zadar players
HNK Hajduk Split players
Neuchâtel Xamax FCS players
Maccabi Tel Aviv F.C. players
Beitar Jerusalem F.C. players
Hapoel Be'er Sheva F.C. players
Hapoel Haifa F.C. players
Hapoel Petah Tikva F.C. players
Maccabi Kiryat Gat F.C. players
Croatian Football League players
Israeli Premier League players
Liga Leumit players
Croatian expatriate footballers
Expatriate footballers in Switzerland
Croatian expatriate sportspeople in Switzerland